Estadio Nido de los Aguilas, is a stadium in Mexicali, Mexico. It is primarily used for baseball and has a capacity of 20,000 spectators.

The stadium hosted the 2009 Caribbean Series.

It serves as the home stadium for Águilas de Mexicali who compete in the Liga Mexicana del Pacifico baseball league.

References

1976 establishments in Mexico
Baseball venues in Mexico
Sport in Mexicali
Sports venues in Baja California
Sports venues completed in 1976